QuickFuse is a web-based telephony application editor and rapid application development platform. QuickFuse users build call flows by visually assembling modules from a library of building blocks that cover the functional requirements of interactive voice response (IVR), messaging, and telephony applications.  QuickFuse uses speech recognition and text-to-speech technology and integrates with other systems through SOAP and REST APIs.

Launch 
QuickFuse was developed by a team of engineers from Plum Voice and is supported by members of Plum's technical operations team.  The platform was made commercially available in 2010 following months of quality assurance testing.

Components 
Application Canvas- used to connect visual models together to create automated workflows.

QuickFuse Outbound Call Manager- an outbound call queue system used to initiate and manage outbound calls.

Simple Database- allows for the creation of database tables that can be used in conjunction with IVR applications.

Underlying Technology 
Plum VoiceXML Platform
Linux Operating System
jQuery
Javascript

References 

Notes
 QuickFuse article in Oakland Press Oakland Press
 QuickFuse mentioned in auto evolution Auto Evolution
 QuickFuse discussed on Web Dev Pro Web Dev Pro
 QuickFuse mentioned in Automotive World Automotive World
 QuickFuse Review- Make voice applications in minutes TruVoiPBuzz TruVoIPBuzz
 QuickFuse featured on VoIp Users Conference VoIP Users Conference
 QuickFuse wins Customer Interaction Solutions magazine 2010 Product of the Year award TMC
 Create Voice Apps From a Point-and-Click Interface with QuickFuse ReadWriteWeb
Come Up With Your Own Voice Apps Killer Startups
ProgrammableWeb Profile ProgrammableWeb
Create Phone Apps in a Snap with QuickFuse Programmable Web
QuickFuse featured on WebDev Radio WebDev Radio
QuickFuse: A Tale of Two Grids SlapStart

External links 
 

Telephony software
Speech recognition software